A partial lunar eclipse will take place on Thursday, July 6, 2028.

Visibility
It will be completely visible over much of Asia, Australia, and eastern Africa, and will be seen rising over the rest of Africa and eastern Europe.

Related lunar eclipses

Eclipses in 2028
 A partial lunar eclipse on Wednesday, 12 January 2028.
 An annular solar eclipse on Wednesday, 26 January 2028.
 A partial lunar eclipse on Thursday, 6 July 2028.
 A total solar eclipse on Saturday, 22 July 2028.
 A total lunar eclipse on Sunday, 31 December 2028.

Lunar year series

Half-Saros cycle
A lunar eclipse will be preceded and followed by solar eclipses by 9 years and 5.5 days (a half saros). This lunar eclipse is related to two total solar eclipses of Solar Saros 127.

Tzolkinex 
 Preceded: Lunar eclipse of May 26, 2021

 Followed: Lunar eclipse of August 19, 2035

See also
List of lunar eclipses and List of 21st-century lunar eclipses

Notes

External links

2028-07
2028-07
2028 in science